Drammen Station (Drammen stasjon) is a railway station located in downtown Drammen in Buskerud, Norway.

History

Drammen Station was first opened in 1866 in Conjunction with the opening of the Randsfjorden Line. The station is the terminus of the Sørlandet Line, the Drammen Line and the Vestfold Line.

The station is served by the Oslo Commuter Rail to Oslo, Kongsberg and Eidsvoll, regional trains on the Vestfold Line and express trains to Bergen on the Bergen Line and to Kristiansand on the Sørlandet Line. From 20 August 2009, the station became the terminus of the Airport Express Train.

References

External links 
 Entry on Drammen Station by Bane NOR 

Railway stations in Buskerud
Railway stations on the Drammen Line
Railway stations on the Randsfjorden Line
Railway stations on the Sørlandet Line
Railway stations on the Vestfold Line
Buildings and structures in Drammen
Railway stations opened in 1866
1866 establishments in Norway
Flytoget